A letter box is a receptacle for receiving mail.

Letterbox may also refer to:

Distribution of advertising mail by letter box drop
Letterboxing (filming), the practice of transferring film shot in a widescreen aspect ratio to standard-width, resulting in a letterbox
Letterboxing (hobby), outdoor orienteering game
Letter Box (TV series), a 1962 Australian game show
"Letterbox", a song by They Might Be Giants from their 1990 album Flood
Letterbox, a 2017 album by Marie Miller
Letterboxing, a method which mitigates Internet tracking by screen size

See also
Letterboxd, a social networking site for films
Party Time (TV series), an Australian game show